Charles Herbert Saperstein (December 23, 1948 – October 31, 2015), known as Charles Herbert, was an American child actor of the 1950s and 1960s. Before reaching his teens, Herbert was renowned by a generation of moviegoers for an on-screen broody, mature style and wit that enabled him to go one-on-one with some of the biggest names in the industry, and his appearances in a handful of films in the sci-fi/horror genre garnered him an immortality there. In six years, he appeared in 20 Hollywood features.

Herbert supported his family from the age of five, and went from being one of the most-desired and highest-paid child actors of his time to one of the multitude of performers Hollywood "discarded" upon reaching maturity. His situation and the lifetime of damage it created for him only recently came to light.

Early life
Herbert was born Charles Herbert Saperstein in Culver City, California, the son of Pearl (Diamond) and Louis Saperstein. According to Herbert, his career began when he was discovered by an agent: "I just happened to be riding on a bus while on a shopping trip with my mother one day, and a gentleman who was a talent agent in Hollywood, named Cosmo Morgan, saw me talking and must have thought I was cute or something. He gave me his card, which I immediately tried to give to the bus driver! That's basically how it started."

Blue-eyed and freckle-faced, Herbert began his acting career at age four, when he appeared on the television series Half Pint Panel (1952). The Long, Long Trailer (1954) would have been his first movie, just after he appeared in the stage production of On Borrowed Time at the Rancho Theatre, but after auditioning with some 40 other kids and chosen for a role, he was cut from the film.

This period was highlighted by a celebrated performance at age eight for his role as a blind child on an episode of Science Fiction Theater (1956). Airing December 22, 1956, "The Miracle Hour" episode is about a man who never gives up hope that his fiancée's blind six-year-old son will not have to spend the holidays in darkness. Herbert starred with Dick Foran and Jean Byron. Five years later, he played the son of a blind man (Rod Steiger) in an episode of NBC's Wagon Train.

Career
What followed included roles in such popular and cult films as The View from Pompey's Head (1955); The Night Holds Terror (1956); These Wilder Years (1956), with James Cagney and Barbara Stanwyck; Gunfight at the O.K. Corral (1957); The Colossus of New York (1958); The Fly (1958); Houseboat (1958); The Man in the Net (1959), with Alan Ladd; The Five Pennies; Please Don't Eat the Daisies (1960); and 13 Ghosts (1960), in which producer/director William Castle gave him top billing at the age of 12 to secure his services.

Herbert's final feature film and starring role was in The Boy and the Pirates (1960), produced and directed by Bert I. Gordon (Mr. B.I.G.), the master of giant monster films, costarring his daughter Susan. Herbert and Susan Gordon had previously worked together in The Man in the Net (1959), the hospital scene in The Five Pennies (1959), and a TV pilot episode  entitled The Secret Life of John Monroe (or The Secret Life of James Thurber). The 30-minute unsold pilot aired as the "Christabel" episode of Alcoa/Goodyear Playhouse, June 8, 1959. Very rarely seen, The Boy and the Pirates was released by Sony Pictures Home Entertainment as a Midnite Movies double DVD set with the more recent Crystalstone  (1987), on June 27, 2006.

During his peak, he was performing nonstop with multiple projects completed each year. By 1959, Herbert had achieved a lofty place among the most-desired and highest-paid child actors of his time, making nearly $1,650 per week. He had established for himself both the reputation and the nickname of "One-Take Charlie". Of his acting style, one reviewer described Herbert as "sincere, accurate, overenunciated at times, like a storybook character come to life. An extraordinary child actor by any standard, Herbert’s intense emotive quality is very much of the method acting school, highly unusual in such a young performer." 

Herbert's work had him opposite Cary Grant, Sophia Loren, David Niven, Vincent Price, Johnny Carson, Donna Reed, Doris Day, and Ross Martin, for all of whom he had high praise for their treatment of him. "Anybody who is in that category [a well-known actor] who is nice to the children is a nice person. 'Cause I worked with some who were not. Children and animals are not big favorites with movie stars."

Starring screen roles in the 1950s soon evaporated, and Herbert was relegated to TV appearances in the 1960s. Growing into that typically awkward teen period, he was forced to subsist on whatever episodic roles he could muster, including bits on Wagon Train (1957), Rawhide (1959), The Twilight Zone (1962), The Fugitive (1963), Hazel (1963), Family Affair (1966), and My Three Sons (1966).

Herbert's career amassed 20 feature films, more than 50 TV shows, and a number of commercials during his youthful 14-year span.

Personal life
Because of the studio attitude toward child actors of the time, Herbert had a keen interest in the child actors of today.

"I lost a lot more than the financial things. Financial things are way down the list for me. The way it’s set up in Hollywood is, I did 50 TV shows, the 20 movies, the commercials, all of that stuff... and when I turned 21, zero had been put away in the bank for me. It was not that way for every [kid actor]: If you signed a long-term contract--for instance, if you did Lassie or The Donna Reed Show or something--they put away like 5 percent for you, but if you were not on a long-term contract, ALL of the money you earned for the movies, for ALL the TV things, went to your guardians; and your guardians could do with it whatever they saw fit."

The only money put away for Herbert until age 21 from his TV and film earnings was $1,700.

 

Describing his studio education as "nonexistent", Herbert attended public schools (Melrose, Bancroft, Fairfax High) rather than one of the private schools tailored to the unique needs of child actors. "My parents made that mistake, without malice; they were not too familiar [with the problems that child actors face]." Herbert made up a story that he had a twin brother and that it was not him whom his classmates were seeing in movies and on TV. Referring to his role in the sci-fi movie classic The Fly, he said, "Back in those days, the very few people who did know I was an actor, when they were kidding me, they’d go, 'Help me, help me, help meeee!'"...

"Herbert was always happiest and at his best when he was performing. A talented actor, he felt secure and confident when the cameras rolled, but like many child actors, he faced difficulties adjusting to the real world beyond the controlled environment inside the studio walls. The career of a child actor often creates a profoundly troubling lack of identity at a difficult time, just after he has lost his commercial value with the onset of puberty." 

Unable to transition into adult roles, Herbert's personal life went downhill, as well. With no formal education or training to do anything else, and with no career earnings saved, he led a reckless, wanderlust life and turned to drugs.

Final years
With no family of his own,  Herbert took nearly 40 years to turn his life around. He was clean and sober from August 2004 until his death, and his films, which reached new generations of fans via DVD and cable TV, and his appearances at science-fiction film festivals and conventions, sustained him.

He expressed deep appreciation of the work Paul Petersen's organization, A Minor Consideration, does by assisting present and former child actors both financially and emotionally. Herbert and Petersen played brothers in the film Houseboat (1958), starring Cary Grant and Sophia Loren, and he guest-starred four times as David Barker from 1958 to 1960 on Petersen's ABC series, The Donna Reed Show.

Beginning in 2009, Herbert appeared annually in the celebrity lineup at the Monster Bash, held each June, at the Pittsburgh, Pennsylvania Airport Four Points with his The Boy and the Pirates costar Susan Gordon. 

Herbert died in Las Vegas on October 31, 2015, from a heart attack.

Filmography

References

External links
 

Male actors from California
American male child actors
American male film actors
American male television actors
20th-century American male actors
Fairfax High School (Los Angeles) alumni
1948 births

2015 deaths
People from Greater Los Angeles